Lin Yuemei (born 29 January 1994) is a Chinese sport shooter.

She participated at the 2018 ISSF World Shooting Championships, winning a medal.

She has qualified to represent China at the 2020 Summer Olympics.

References

External links

Living people
1994 births
Chinese female sport shooters
ISSF pistol shooters
Sport shooters from Fujian
Shooters at the 2018 Asian Games
Universiade gold medalists for China
Universiade bronze medalists for China
Universiade medalists in shooting
Asian Games competitors for China
Medalists at the 2015 Summer Universiade
Shooters at the 2020 Summer Olympics
21st-century Chinese women